Dorycera is a genus of picture-winged flies in the family Ulidiidae.

Species

 D. brevis Loew, 1868
 D. caucasica
 D. conspersa
 D. graminum (Fabricius, 1794)
 D. grandis (Rondani, 1869)
 D. hybrida Loew, 1862
 D. inornata Loew, 1864
 D. judea
 D. limpidipennis
 D. longiceps
 D. maculipennis Macquart, 1843
 D. melanotica
 D. nitida
 D. persica
 D. pictipennis
 D. scalaris
 D. subasiatica
 D. syriaca
 D. tuberculosa Hendel, 1908

References

 
Taxa named by Johann Wilhelm Meigen
Brachycera genera